The 2018–19 Basketbol Süper Ligi was the 53rd season of the Basketbol Süper Ligi, the top-tier level professional club basketball league in Turkey. The season started on 6 October 2018 and ended 21 June 2019.

Anadolu Efes captured its fourteenth title and its first championship in 10 years, after it defeated Fenerbahçe in seven in the finals.

Teams

Promotion and relegation
Yeşilgiresun Belediye and Uşak Sportif were relegated after finishing in the last two places during the previous season. Türk Telekom promoted as the champions of the Turkish Basketball First League (TBL). Afyon Belediye promoted as the winners of the play-offs.

On 12 July 2018, Eskişehir Basket announced its withdrawal from the BSL. On 13 July 2018, it was announced that Bahçeşehir Koleji received the vacant BSL spot.

On 2 October 2018, Trabzonspor announced its withdrawal from the BSL.

Locations and stadia

Personnel and sponsorship

Regular season

League table

Results

Playoffs

Awards and statistics

Statistical leaders

Turkish clubs in European competitions

References

Turkish Basketball Super League seasons
1
Turkey